Denton High School is a public high school located in the city of Denton, Texas and classified as a 5A school by the UIL.  It is a part of the Denton Independent School District located in central Denton County and was the original high school for Denton.

Denton High School was established in 1884. In 1910 it moved to what is now Calhoun Middle School. In 1957 it moved again to its current location on Fulton Street. In the 1990s, DHS yielded grades 10–12 to the newly opened Ryan High School until 1995. In 2015, the school was rated "Met Standard" by the Texas Education Agency.

After voters approved a May 2018 Capital Improvement Plan, Denton ISD purchased land to rebuild Denton High School at a new location and expand the school land size from 35 acres to 150 acres. The site is located north of Windsor Drive, west of North Bonnie Brae Street and south of North Elm Street (U.S. Hwy 77) near the University of North Texas Discovery Park and less than 1.5 miles from the current Denton High location at 1007 Fulton Street.

Attendance boundary
Its boundary includes sections of Denton. Previously the boundary included Paloma Creek South and sections of Paloma Creek and Savannah, and small sections of Cross Roads, Little Elm, and Prosper.

Athletics
The Denton Broncos compete in these sports

Volleyball, Cross Country, Football, Basketball, Swimming, Water Polo, Soccer, Golf, Tennis, Track and Field, Baseball, and Softball.

State Titles
Denton (UIL)
Boys Basketball
1930(All), 1935(All)
Girls Soccer
2003(4A)
2004(4A)
Girls Golf
1984(5A) Buffy Klein
Boys Swimming
1981(All) Chuck Ponthier (50-Yard Freestyle)
Boys Cross Country
2020 State 3rd Place (5A) 
2021 State Runner Up (5A)

Alumni

Mario Bennett: National Basketball Association power forward with the Phoenix Suns, Los Angeles Lakers, Chicago Bulls
Mark Behning: NFL offensive tackle with the Pittsburgh Steelers
Aaron Graham: NFL center with the Arizona Cardinals, Oakland Raiders and Tennessee Titans
Phil Armour: NFL center with the Indianapolis Colts
Phyllis George: Miss Texas (1970), Miss America (1971), pioneer female sportscaster for CBS, former First Lady of Kentucky
Shirley Cothran: Miss Texas (1974), Miss America (1975)
Tim Duryea, basketball head coach, Utah State
Nancy Gates: actress
Lynn Harrell: cellist
Herman Johnson: NFL offensive tackle with the Chicago Bears
John Lott: NFL offensive tackle with the Pittsburgh Steelers, formerly at the University of North Texas.
Jordan Malone:  world champion inline skater, Olympic short track speed skater
Tim Tadlock: head coach of the Texas Tech Red Raiders baseball program
Louise Tobin: jazz singer
Skip Johnson: head coach of Oklahoma Sooners baseball program
John Nelson: 2006 World Series champion with the St. Louis Cardinals
Hunter Dozier: MLB infielder for the Kansas City Royals. Selected as the eighth overall pick of the 2013 Major League Baseball draft.
David Robinson: U.S. Navy vice admiral
Ann Sheridan: Hollywood actress and pin-up girl of the 1940s. Nicknamed "The Oomph Girl". 
Don Woods: 1974 NFL Offensive Rookie of the Year for the San Diego Chargers
Kody West: Country musician

References

External links

Denton Independent School District Website
Denton High School
The Horseshoe Newspaper
Denton High School Athletics - THE Denton High
Bronco Tennis
Denton ISD FFA Alumni Association

Denton Independent School District high schools
International Baccalaureate schools in Texas
Buildings and structures in Denton, Texas
1884 establishments in Texas
Educational institutions established in 1884